Devetàshka cave is a large karst cave around  east of Letnitsa and  northeast of Lovech, near the village of Devetaki on the east bank of the river Osam, in Bulgaria. The site has been continuously  occupied by Paleo humans for tens of thousands of years, served as a shelter for various faunal species during extensive periods and is now home to nearly 30,000 bats.

Location

A narrow path by the river leads from the village to the cave. It is rich in speleothems, stalagmites, stalactites, countless rivulets and majestic natural domes.

Several large openings in the ceiling allow daylight to lighten the vast interior, due to commercial use of the site during the 1950s.

Rediscovered in 1921, excavations began only in the 1950s and revealed almost continuous human occupation since the late Paleolithic. Earliest traces of human presence date back to the Middle Paleolithic around 70,000 years ago. The site also contained one of the richest sources of Neolithic cultural artifacts (6,000 to 4,000 BC).

Fauna
Besides significant archaeological findings, Devetashka cave provides a habitat for a wide diversity of faunal residents. During the breeding season of mammalian species in the cave from early June to the end of July, the site is entirely closed to visitors. Twelve species of protected amphibians and reptiles, including the Aesculapian snake (Zamenis longissimus), the Triturus (Triturus cristatus), the European tree frog (Hyla arborea), Hermann's tortoise (Testudo hermanni), eighty-two bird species can be found in the area, thirteen of which are included in the Red List. Thirty-four species of mammals, four of which are included in the Red List and fifteen species of bats are to be found at the Devetashka cave.

Filming
Devetashka cave was shown in the action movie The Expendables 2, filmed in 2011. The Supreme Administrative Court of Bulgaria declared that several activities during filming violated Bulgaria's environmental regulations. A contractor hired by The Expendables crew was subsequently fined for trimming the shrubbery in front of the site. After a fatal accident during the filming of a stunt, the production team again clashed with the authorities over damages to the cave. Loud noises, bright lights, crowds of people and fires in close proximity to the cave might have caused the displacement of large numbers of bats from the cave. However, by late 2012, the majority of the bats had returned to the cave.

References

External links
 
 Devetashka Cave

History of Lovech Province
Landforms of Lovech Province
Archaeological sites in Bulgaria
Caves of Bulgaria
Limestone caves